Danville Stadium is a baseball stadium in Danville, Illinois, located at 610 Highland Boulevard.  

Danville Stadium is currently home to the Danville Dans of the collegiate summer Prospect League.  The ballpark was formerly home of the Danville Warriors, which was a Class A minor league baseball team in the Midwest League. Originally built in 1946, the park has a capacity of 4,000 people.  Selected scenes from the 1992 movie The Babe were filmed here.

References

Bill Franz, Bob Puhala, Lyndee Jobe Henderson, Illinois Off the Beaten Path - Page 117, Globe Pequot, 2007, 
Brent P. Kelley, The Negro Leagues Revisited: Conversations with 66 More Baseball Heroes - Page 374, McFarland & Company, 2000, 

Minor league baseball venues
Baseball venues in Illinois
Buildings and structures in Danville, Illinois
Sports in Danville, Illinois
1946 establishments in Illinois
Sports venues completed in 1946
Mississippi-Ohio Valley League
Defunct Midwest League ballparks